The  is a 2.1 km heritage railway line owned by Kitakyushu City and operated by Heisei Chikuhō Railway. The line runs on a former freight route in Moji-ku, Kitakyushu, Fukuoka Prefecture, Japan. One passenger train named the  runs on the track.

History
After the closure of these lines, multiple proposals were made to preserve these lines as a heritage railway. One such proposal by the Heisei Chikuhō Railway was finally approved on March 13, 2008 between Mojikō Station and Mekari Park (now Kanmon Straits Mekari Station).

In preparation for its reopening, promotional events were held on the tracks throughout 2008. Plans for the railroad was formally announced January 2009, and naming rights to the station were sold before its formal opening on April 26. For their preservation efforts, Kitakyushu City was awarded a "Railroad Cultural and Tourism Award" by the Ministry of Land, Infrastructure, Transport and Tourism.

The 2018 Japan floods heavily damaged the tracks, forcing the line to be closed for a month.

Operations
One four-car passenger train named the  runs on the track. The line operates between March and November. Except for certain weeks, trains only operate on the weekends and holidays. Eleven round-trip services are run per day at 40-minute intervals.

Though operated by the Heisei Chikuhō Railway, this line does not connect to the rest of Heichiku's network. The line is not electrified and is single-tracked for the entire line.

Stations
All stations are within Moji-ku, Kitakyushu, Fukuoka Prefecture.

References

 
Railway lines in Japan
Rail transport in Fukuoka Prefecture
Railway lines opened in 2009
Japanese third-sector railway lines
Heritage railways in Japan